Eduard August Friedrich Freiherr von Schele zu Schelenburg (September 23, 1805 – February 13, 1875) was Prime Minister of the Kingdom of Hanover and the last Post Director General of the Thurn-und-Taxis Post in Frankfurt.

He was born and buried in Schelenburg.

Notes

1805 births
1875 deaths
German politicians
Barons of Germany
Postal history of Germany